Letur-Lefr (pronunciation: /'lɛtɹ̩ 'lɛfɹ̩/) is the fourth EP by John Frusciante, released on July 17, 2012 on Record Collection. It was released in multiple formats including 32-bit digital download and cassette. The EP features Frusciante singing, playing all the instruments and engineering, as well as his ex-wife performing backing vocals and a "few friends on vocals, mostly MC'ing".

Frusciante said of this album and its follow-up, PBX Funicular Intaglio Zone, "I consider my music to be Progressive Synth Pop, which says nothing about what it sounds like, but does describe my basic approach. I combine aspects of many styles of music and create my own musical forms by way of electronic instruments. The tracks on Letur-Lefr were recorded in 2010 and PBX was recorded in 2011. Letur is a compilation, a selected portion of music I made that year while PBX was conceived as an album, the songs having been recorded in succession. The records are very different from each other."

Title
According to Frusciante, the EP's title "signifies the transition of two becoming one, notably symbolized by the first song on the album being the sequel to the album's last."

Track listing

Personnel

Musicians
 John Frusciante - vocals, backing vocals (stated as "female backing vocals" on booklet), synthesizers, guitar, samples, drum machine
 Nicole Turley - vocals (1)
 RZA - vocals (2, 5)
 Leggezin Fin - vocals (2)
 Masia One - vocals (2, 3)
 Kinetic 9 - vocals (2, 4)
 Rugged Monk - vocals (4)

Recording personnel
 John Frusciante - production
 Anthony Zamora - studio manager

Artwork
 John Frusciante - cover art and design
 Julian Chavez - cover design

Charts

References

John Frusciante albums
2012 EPs